Mu Shuangshuang (穆爽爽; born July 7, 1984) is a Chinese weightlifter from Shuangliao, Jilin. She competes in the over-75 kg category.

In 2005, 2006, and 2007 she won the silver medal in World Weightlifting Championships.

On 6 December 2006 she set a new world record of 139 kg for the snatch  at the World Championship in Doha  and on 26 September 2007 she set a new overall world record of 319 kg at the World Championship in Chiang Mai, Thailand.

She was not selected to compete in the 2008 Olympic Games.

References 
http://www.chinadaily.com.cn/olympics/2008-05/28/content_6717450.htm

1984 births
Living people
Chinese female weightlifters
Asian Games medalists in weightlifting
Weightlifters from Jilin
People from Siping
Weightlifters at the 2006 Asian Games
Asian Games gold medalists for China
Medalists at the 2006 Asian Games
21st-century Chinese women